U42 or U-42 may refer to:

 German submarine U-42, one of several German submarines
 U42, the FAA location identifier for the Salt Lake City Municipal 2 Airport